Walter Pompe (22 November 1703, Lith – 16 February 1777, Antwerp) was a Flemish master-sculptor, known for his religious works in wood.

Pompe is known for his fine wood sculpting. He was student of Michiel Van de Voort, from Antwerp.   Often he designed baroque interiors for important churches.

Works 
 Turnhout, St-Peters
 Beveren, St-Martins group of H. Family
 Oostmalle
 Antwerpen, 
 Antwerpen, Royal Museum of fine Arts 
 Abbey of Tongerloo 

1703 births
1777 deaths
Dutch sculptors
Dutch male sculptors
Flemish sculptors (before 1830)
People from Oss